Hasulazgi (also Romanized as Ḩasūlazgī; also known as Ḩasūlazgū) is a village in Chaybasar-e Jonubi Rural District, in the Central District of Maku County, West Azerbaijan Province, Iran. At the 2006 census, its population was 84, in 16 families.

References 

Populated places in Maku County